The VAZ-2106 Zhiguli (alternatively Zhiguli 2106) is a sedan produced by the Soviet (later Russian) automaker VAZ, and later, after the breakup of the Soviet Union, also by Russian Izhevsk Avto and Ukrainian . In export markets, it was known simply as Lada 1600 or alternatively as Lada 2106. In the domestic market it was popularly nicknamed Шестёрка (Shestyorka, in English; The sixth one). A hugely popular car and one of the most successful Lada models, it was in serial production for 30 years (from 1976 to 2006), although production in the VAZ plant ended after 25 years, in 2001, with manufacture continuing at Izhevsk for the final five years.

Overview
Derived from its predecessor, the VAZ-2103, 2106 was created as its alternative due to expense and complexity of production of chrome elements which were severely reduced on it (although it did not fully replace it until 1984, when the 2103 was finally discontinued). Like the 2103, the 2106 was a four-door, four-seat saloon, but powered by a more powerful   single overhead cam inline four engine of Lada's own design. It used the pistons of the VAZ-21011's  and the crankshaft of the VAZ-2103's . For many consumers, it was "the top of the Eastern Bloc charts for comfort and prestige", since the more expensive and luxurious GAZ and ZIL cars, intended firstly for party members and various other state officials, were out of reach for them.

It debuted in December of 1975, and "would become the most popular and most numerous VAZ product". It externally differed from its predecessor, the VAZ-2103, firstly by having smaller grille due to having plastic headlight surrounds, different bumpers and by wider taillights also featuring reverse lights, which were then a new feature for VAZ models. Internally it was almost as same as its predecessor with only minimal differences; most notably by being the first VAZ model with height adjustable headrests on front seats and also by its steering wheel; it was visually easily recognizable by being decorated with classic Russian ornaments together with Lada logo on its central (leather) part. In 1976, due to being the latest model in VAZ arsenal, it served as a basis for latest prototype what would become the highly successful VAZ-2121 Niva or Lada Niva 1600 the next year. It borrowed many of its elements to it, like firstly its 1600 cc  petrol engine, as well as its headlights and taillights, direction pointers, side/external mirrors, front seat headrests, steering wheel, instruments and many other details. The VAZ-2106 was severely restyled in the second half of 1990s, its chrome lined elements were further reduced; the chrome external/side mirrors became black metallic back in the first half of 1980s when the VAZ-2103 was discontinued, however, the grille was now replaced with black plastic one, also featuring a new front Lada badge. Chrome lined rim covers and exterior body part edges were also removed. However, the chromed bumpers as well as Fiat 124 door knobs were still present until the very end of production. Internally, the aging Fiat 125 steering wheel (firstly used by VAZ-2103 and later by VAZ-2121 Niva) also featuring chrome elements was replaced by newer one. The previous wood imitation dashboard was replaced with black one and, along with some other details, its original berth foldable seats were also replaced with more modern ones.

The 21063 would disappear in 1993. The less-powerful, but also cheaper, 21061 would be the sales leader, helping make the 2106 the top-selling Lada model. In Canada, the model was sold from late 1978-early 1979 as the Lada Signet, with the official factory name being VAZ 21061-37. It was made up to 1984. One variant of this model is the 21061-41, which had Canadian Domestic Market bumpers and fitments, but it featured European Domestic Market repeaters, tail lights, side logo, etc. This model is one of the rarest of the 2106 series, and some examples survive in the former USSR and in Europe.

In 2017, an old VAZ-2106 participating in the Banjul Challenge traversed twelve European and African countries in 15 days, starting in Saint Petersburg and finishing in Banjul, the Gambia. The car was eventually given to local residents, while four travellers returned home on a plane.

Safety by modern standards
In 2002, the IZhmash version of the VAZ-2106 was awarded zero stars out of a possible four by the Russian ARCAP safety assessment program. The reviewers noted that the result was unsurprising and that the car was outdated by the time of the test, with its construction dating back to the 1960s.

References

External links

Compact cars
ARCAP small family cars
Cars of Russia
Cars introduced in 1976
1980s cars
1990s cars
2000s cars
2106
Soviet automobiles
Italy–Soviet Union relations